Varanasi Multi-Modal Terminal or Varanasi Port is an Inland river port situated in the city of Varanasi, Uttar Pradesh. The port is located on the Ganges river. This port is built under the government's Jal Marg Vikas project. The port has provided a direct link with the Port of Kolkata and Haldia Port.

The cargo handling capacity of the port or terminal is estimated to be 1.2 million metric tons per year (MTPA). The Port was completed in 2018

Facilities
The port has the ability to anchor two ships at a time simultaneously. The port also has other facilities which include deposit area, commodity transit shade, parking area etc. It also has floating jetty with terminal for passenger transport.

References

Economy of Varanasi
Ports and harbours of Uttar Pradesh
Transport in Varanasi
River ports of India
Intermodal transport